Mamadou Loum N'Diaye (born 30 December 1996) is a Senegalese professional footballer who plays as a midfielder for Reading, on loan from Porto, and the Senegal national team.

Club career
Loum made his professional debut in the Segunda Liga for S.C. Braga B on 15 August 2015 in a game against Gil Vicente F.C., as a 70th-minute substitute for Carlos Fortes. He was called up once for S.C. Braga for their Primeira Liga game away to F.C. Paços de Ferreira on 23 April 2017, remaining unused in a 3–1 loss. A day before the anniversary of that game, he was sent off at the end of a 2–2 home draw with Académico de Viseu FC.

On 30 July 2018, Loum was loaned to top-flight team Moreirense F.C. for the season. He scored his first goal on 2 November in a 3–1 win at eventual champions S.L. Benfica. 

In January 2019, Loum moved to FC Porto on a loan deal for the rest of the season with an option to turn the deal permanent. He played three games over the rest of the season and then the club paid €7.75 million for 75% of his economic rights. On 2 December, he started a 2–0 home win over Paços de Ferreira and scored the opening goal.

On 23 July 2021, after featuring rarely for Porto, Loum was loaned to La Liga side Deportivo Alavés for the 2021–22 campaign.

On 30 July 2022, Loum joined EFL Championship club Reading on a season-long loan.

International career
Loum represented Senegal at the 2015 FIFA U-20 World Cup. He made his debut for the senior team on 26 March 2019 in a friendly against Mali, playing the full 90 minutes of a 2–1 win in Dakar. He was called up for the 2021 Africa Cup of Nations, which the team won in Cameroon at the start of the following year; his one appearance was a goalless draw with neighbours Guinea in the final group game.

Career statistics

Club

International

Honours 
Porto
 Primeira Liga: 2019–20
 Taça de Portugal: 2019–20

Senegal
Africa Cup of Nations: 2021

References

External links

1996 births
Living people
Footballers from Dakar
Senegalese footballers
Association football midfielders
Primeira Liga players
Liga Portugal 2 players
La Liga players
S.C. Braga B players
Moreirense F.C. players
FC Porto players
FC Porto B players
Deportivo Alavés players
Reading F.C. players
2021 Africa Cup of Nations players
2022 FIFA World Cup players
Africa Cup of Nations-winning players
Senegalese expatriate footballers
Expatriate footballers in Portugal
Expatriate footballers in Spain
Expatriate footballers in England
Senegalese expatriate sportspeople in Portugal
Senegalese expatriate sportspeople in Spain
Senegalese expatriate sportspeople in England
Senegal youth international footballers
Senegal international footballers